The Lakeside and Haverthwaite Railway (L&HR) is a  heritage railway in Cumbria, England.

Location
The L&HR runs from Haverthwaite at the southern end of the line via Newby Bridge to Lakeside at the southern end of Windermere. Some services are timed to connect with sailings of the diesel excursion vessels or steam vessels on Windermere, sailing from Lakeside to Bowness and Ambleside.

Furness Railway operation of the branch line
The railway is a former branch line of the Furness Railway (FR) and was opened on 1 June 1869. The line was served by local passenger trains which started their journey at Ulverston on the FR's mainline from Carnforth to Barrow-in-Furness. The FR branch trains travelled east to the triangular junction at Plumpton and then turned north via Greenodd and on to stations at Haverthwaite, Newby Bridge halt and Lakeside. The FR's weekdays passenger service in July 1922 comprised eight trains in each direction. There were advertised train-to-boat connections that were established in 1869. During the summer season, excursion trains from Lancashire and elsewhere used the east-to-north side of Plumpton Junction to reach Lakeside, where their passengers joined the boat sailings on the lake.

Closure of the branch and re-opening by L&HR
British Railways closed the line to passengers on 6 September 1965, and to all traffic two years later.

A group of enthusiasts chaired by Dr Peter Beet formed the Lakeside Railway Estates Company, with the idea of preserving both the line and the former LMS 10A locomotive shed at Carnforth, to provide a complete steam operating system. However, although backed by then transport minister Barbara Castle, the need to build a number of motorway bridges and re-routing of the A590 road from Haverthwaite via Greenodd to Plumpton Junction, meant that the complete vision was unsuccessful. Beet acquired 10A in partnership with Sir William McAlpine, 6th Baronet, which became the visitor attraction Steamtown from 1967. The venture folded as a public access visitor attraction in 1997, but the preserved site was taken over by businessman David Smith to become the base for his West Coast Railway Company.

Resultantly, Austin Maher became chairman of the LREC, which then re-opened the truncated  L&HR as a heritage railway on 2 May 1973. Maher and fellow L&HR director Jim Morris each bought one LMS 2-6-4T Class 4MT, Nos. 42073 (Maher) and 42085 (Morris), which eventually restored as L&HR Nos. 3 and 4 became the lines core steam power units.

Stations

In fiction
In Christopher Awdry's book "Thomas & Victoria", the Lakeside & Haverthwaite Railway is featured as part of the railway route where Victoria worked before going to Sodor. In the Thomas the Tank Engine TV series, the railway was filmed for a series of short educational segments entitled "Down at the Station."

In the adaptation of Agatha Christie's novel, Dumb Witness, by ITV for its television series, Agatha Christie's Poirot, the opening scene was filmed at the Lakeside & Haverthwaite Railway, at the Lakeside terminus.

The railway and Haverthwaite station are featured in the video to Never Went to Church by alternative hip hop band The Streets.

Locomotives

Steam locomotives

Steam locomotives currently at the railway

Information below derived from the Lakeside and Haverthwaite Railway Visitors Guide sixth edition and the IRS reference book.

Operational

Inactive

Steam locomotives formerly at the railway

The list of locomotives below contains those currently identified as having been resident at Haverthwaite in the past. It is, in all probability, not an exhaustive list.

Diesel

Diesel locomotives currently at the railway

Information below derived from the Lakeside and Haverthwaite Railway Visitors Guide sixth edition and the IRS reference book.

Operational

Inactive

Self-powered diesel crane

Not a locomotive in the traditional sense but is capable of, and has been used for, limited shunting operations.

Diesel locomotives formerly at the railway

The list of locomotives below contains those currently identified as having been resident at Haverthwaite in the past. It is, in all probability, not an exhaustive list.

Rolling stock

Coaches

Information below derived from the Lakeside and Haverthwaite Railway Visitors Guide sixth edition.

Wagons

There are a selection of assorted goods vehicles, many of which are used for maintenance work along the line.

References

Notes

Bibliography

External links

Photos of the entire railway

 
Heritage railways in Cumbria
Furness
Railway lines opened in 1869